Silvia Caos (August 10, 1933 – April 16, 2006) was a Cuban-born Mexican actress. She known for Quinceañera, María la del barrio and La Usurpadora

Biography 
Caos was born August 10, 1933, in Havana, Cuba. She left her country and went to Mexico, where she obtained her nationality and began her career as an actress. It debuted in 1958 in the telenovela Más allá de la angustia. Much of her career was developed on television, participating in more than 20 novels, among the most remembered Quinceañera, María la del barrio and La usurpadora. Also participated in films Matrimonio y sexo, Presagio and El mexicano. One of its most important roles and that is remembered today, is that of the Nana Calixta in Maria la del Barrio in 1995.

Caos died on April 16, 2006, because of lung cancer.

Filmography

Theatre
Claudia - Jueza Mundoch
La Tercera Soledad - Katherine Dulac
Nube Nueve

References

External links 
 

1933 births
2006 deaths
Deaths from cancer in Mexico
Deaths from lung cancer
Mexican telenovela actresses
Mexican television actresses
Mexican film actresses
Mexican stage actresses
Actresses from Havana
20th-century Mexican actresses
21st-century Mexican actresses
Cuban emigrants to Mexico
Naturalized citizens of Mexico
Mexican people of Cuban descent